There are several rivers named Guariba River in Brazil:

 Guariba River (Aripuanã River tributary), in Amazonas & Mato Grosso
 Guariba River (Pauini River tributary), in Amazonas